Treskilling is a hamlet west of Luxulyan, Cornwall, England, United Kingdom.

References

Hamlets in Cornwall